Leo R. Sack (July 9, 1889April 15, 1956) was an American journalist and diplomat who served as ambassador to Costa Rica from 1933 to 1937.

Sack, from Mississippi, attended the University of Missouri, and later served in World War I in the United States Army Air Service. He was a journalist, both in the South and in Washington, D.C.

Sack served in the United States Diplomatic Service from September 1933 until he resigned his post in order to associate with Schenley. After his resignation, Edward Albright was appointed to replace him; but after Albright's death, William H. Hornibrook ultimately became the new minister. Later, he started a public relations firm.

He died in 1956 from a kidney ailment; his wife and his daughter survived him.

References

External links
 Sack Named Minister

1889 births
1956 deaths
Ambassadors of the United States to Costa Rica
United States Army personnel of World War I
People from Los Angeles
Politicians from Tupelo, Mississippi
University of Missouri alumni